Lotte and the Moonstone Secret is a 2011 Estonian animated film directed by Heiki Ernits and Janno Põldma. It is the third installment in the Lotte film series.

The film's characters first appeared in Lotte's Journey South, an Estonian animated TV series, containing 13 five-minute episodes. In 2006, the animated feature film Lotte from Gadgetville was released.

Voice cast
 Evelin Pang as Lotte
 Margus Tabor as Klaus
 Mait Malmsten as Jaak the Fly
 Mikk Jürjens as Tik the Moon Rabbit
 Tõnu Oja as Rihv the Moon Rabbit
 Lembit Ulfsak as Fred the Dog / Lotte's Father Oskar
 Priit Võigemast as Paul the Cat
 Tiit Sukk as Voldemar the Pig
 Merle Palmiste as Benita the Cow
 Garmen Tabor as Lotte's Mother Anna / Giraffe in Dream
 Elina Reinold as Ernst the Spider / Uno the Tiny Illness Man
 Tõnu Kark	as Ville the Dog
 Anne Reemann as Matilda the Cat
 Anu Lamp as Parrot
 Hannes Kaljujärv as Leo the Seal / Hannes the Snow Lion
  as Tuhh the Moon Rabbit

References

External links
 
 Lottemaa - Lotte Village Theme Park English Homepage

2011 films
2011 animated films
Estonian animated films
Estonian-language films
Estonian children's films